Ghazi Abad غازی آباد is an emerging town of Chichawatni Tehsil in Punjab, Pakistan. It exists on the road head of Chechawatni-Burewala, connecting Karachi with Lahore and Islamabad.The leader and famous personality of the area Adda Ghaziabad is "Lamberdar Kamran Qamar Kayani" (Grand son of Capt(R) SHAH JAHAN KAYANI).He is also a political figure.Raja Gulsher Haider Kayani is also a well known politician of this area.The main and powerful families of this area are 'GAKHAR-KAYANI' family.Kayani families have the major part of agriculture land and commercial land in this area.The majority of people in chak no 21/11L are RAJA Braadri(برادری).This village is also called 21 chak (Rajgaan)راجگان.The main hobby of these peoples is hunting.The other two numberdar's of this village are "Numberdar Raja Imran Habib Abbasi" and "Numberdar Raja Toseef Zafar".The KAYANI family contributed land for hospital in Ghaziabad for those people who cannot afford medical expenses,named as "BRIG(R) SHABBIR AHMAD KAYANI MEDICAL COMPLEX" which is in underconstruction.

History 

As per the District Gazetteer 1883–84, Sahiwal (earlier known as Montgomery and formally Gugera), the entire area was rarely populated; with nearly three thousand inhabitants in 1881 census. The current area was neither cultivated nor showed civilized shape until the mid-19th century. After World War I, British government gave award land to military veterans in the area keep the area under direct control, while bringing civilization in the area.

The area got a proper shape when the canal system was established after Indus Waters Treaty in 1962.

Significance 
The word Ghazi is associated with term Islamic Warrior, the name was given to the village due to military contributions of earlier and subsequent residents.

Occupation 
Most of villagers are dependent on agriculture, while a large number is associated with government and private services. Some labor are also found in bricks factory, however the number of these families are found less after government imposed restriction of child labor.

Education 
Due to its central location, the area is specially getting fame with respect to educational facilities. Besides government schools for boys and girls, it also offers a number of other private and government ventures like Franchise of Allied, Educator and Divisional Public School (DPS). The area also offer quality Islamic education in various small Mardissa, present in the form of Al-Qalam Institute.

References

Populated places in Sahiwal District